Harold Hyman is a Paris-based journalist.  He was born in New York City, attended the Lycée Français de New York, and graduated from Columbia University with a degree in international affairs.  He has been a journalist in Paris since 1988, specializing in international diplomacy and international cultural relations. He began his journalism career writing for French and Spanish newspapers, and went on to radio journalist on French radio stations Radio France International and Radio Classique.  He currently covers international and American news as a broadcast journalist at CNews, a French TV news network in Paris, France.

References

External links 
  blog officiel

Year of birth missing (living people)
Living people
American television journalists
School of International and Public Affairs, Columbia University alumni
Journalists from New York City
Lycée Français de New York alumni
American male journalists